The 2010 Georgia Bulldogs football team represented the University of Georgia in the 2010 NCAA Division I FBS football season. The Bulldogs competed in the East Division of the Southeastern Conference (SEC). This was the Georgia Bulldogs' tenth season for head coach Mark Richt. They finished the season 6–7, 3–5 in SEC play and were invited to the Liberty Bowl, where they were defeated by UCF, 10–6.

Schedule

Source:

Roster

Rankings

NFL Draft

References

Georgia
Georgia Bulldogs football seasons
Georgia Bulldogs football